The  Japan Series, the 57th edition of Nippon Professional Baseball's championship series,  began on October 21 and ended on October 26, and matched the Central League champion Chunichi Dragons against the Pacific League champion, Hokkaido Nippon Ham Fighters. The Fighters won the Series in five games, taking Games 2,3,4 and 5.

Summary

Game 1 

Game 1 saw both aces pitch for their respective teams: Darvish for the Fighters, Kawakami for the Dragons.  Both pitchers started off well, but Darvish, who had bouts with wildness in the regular season, saw his control unravel in the 2nd inning, giving away the 2-0 Fighters lead to which he had been staked in the top of the inning.  Chunichi scratched across one more in the 3rd and one in the 8th to put the home Dragons on top, 4-2.  Longtime Dragons closer Iwase shut down the Fighters in the 9th to put the Dragons on top 1 game to none.

Game 2 

Super rookie Tomoya Yagi took the mound for Nippon Ham in Game 2, still flying high from out-dueling SoftBank Hawks ace Kazumi Saitoh.  He would out-duel another veteran, this time screwballer Masahiro Yamamoto.  In the battle of the lefties, the only two mistakes Yagi would make would be to Hirokazu Ibata and Kosuke Fukudome, both solo shots.

Game 3

Game 4

Game 5 

Game 5 would also be Tsuyoshi Shinjo's last game as he announced his retirement at the beginning of the 2006 season. With the win, Shinjo ended his career in storybook fashion, finally winning his first Japan Series title in his final season.

See also
2006 World Series

References

Japan Series
Japan Series
Chunichi Dragons
Hokkaido Nippon-Ham Fighters